John Allen Kuchar Zegrus (Jon Aren Kacchā Jīgurasu) is the reported name of a real man detained in 1960 in Japan for alleged document fabrication. He was dubbed as the "Mystery Man" by Japanese news at the time, and became a prototype for some urban legends.

Incident 
In October 1959, a man recorded as John Allen Kuchar Zegrus, 36, entered Japan with his Korean wife. He tried to cash a 200,000-yen cheque and a 140-dollar (around 50,400 yen at the time) traveller's cheque at the Japanese office of Chase Manhattan Bank, and 100,000 yen at the Japanese office of Bank of Korea.

Although his passport contained the stamps of Japanese embassies in different East Asian countries, the passport was determined to be counterfeit. Moreover, a visa was issued by the Japanese embassy in Taipei (now reorganized as the Japan–Taiwan Exchange Association).

According to the records, Zegrus said he was "born in the US, moved to the UK through Czechoslovakia and Germany, and attended High School there. During World War II he was a pilot of the Royal Air Force, and was once captured by the Germans. After the war, he lived in Latin America. Later he became a spy for the Americans in South Korea, served as a pilot in Thailand and Vietnam, and after that he was assigned by the United Arab Republic. He arrived to Japan for a secret mission, which included recruiting Japanese military volunteers for the United Arab Republic." Eventually, after contacting the mentioned countries, it was ruled that the information was not based on any facts, and the seals in his pseudo-passport were proven to be fabricated.

On 10 August 1960, Tokyo District Court reviewed the case and sentenced Zegrus to one year in prison. After the announcement, he tried to commit suicide by cutting his veins with a piece of a glass secretly brought by him to the court.

After his release, Zegrus was deported from Japan to Hong Kong, from where he was recorded to enter the region. His wife was deported to South Korea.

In urban legends 
On an August 15, 1960 issue of The Province, the story was reported with some alterations. The newspaper said in an article titled "Man with his own country" claimed that John Allen Kuchar Zegrus claimed to be "a naturalized Ethiopian and an intelligence agent for Colonel Nasser", and carried a passport "issued at Tamanrasset, the capital of Taured south of the Sahara". Taured is likely Tuareg misspelled, and Tamanrasset is an actual province in Algeria. A text in "Taured language" written with Latin characters was also cited by the newspaper. Earlier on 29 July 1960, the story in this form was mentioned in the British House of Commons, when it was cited by Robert Mathew as an argument that "passports are not very good security checks".

The case was mentioned since 1964 in the books by Jacques Bergier. According to his version of the story, a person from Tuared, a country in Eastern Africa which "stretched from Mauritania to Sudan and included a large part of Algeria", was arrested in 1954 in Japan during a passport check and shut up in psychiatric hospital, where it was revealed that he came to "buy arms for the true Arab Legion". The country in this story alludes to the United Arab Republic, which in fact included modern Syria and Egypt. In 1981, the story was mentioned in a book, The Directory of Possibilities, by Colin Wilson and John Grant, with Tuareg misspelled again as Taured.

Finally, a story featured on various Japanese websites dedicated to urban legends and occult stories says that a "man from another dimension" arrived at Haneda airport in 1954. He possessed a Taured passport, and when asked about his country, he pointed at Andorra, but was confused as he never heard of Andorra. He was placed in a hotel with two guards for investigation, but disappeared from there the following morning.

References 

Criminals
Fraudsters
Unidentified people
Urban legends